Francis Moore (born 1858, date of death unknown) was a United States Navy sailor and a recipient of the United States military's highest decoration, the Medal of Honor.

Biography
Born in 1858 in New York County, New York, Moore joined the Navy from that state. By January 23, 1882, he was serving as a boatswain's mate on the training ship . On that day, while Portsmouth was at the Washington Navy Yard, Moore jumped overboard in an attempt to rescue carpenter and caulker, Thomas Duncan, who had fallen overboard, from drowning. For this action, he was awarded the Medal of Honor three years later, on October 18, 1884.

Moore's official Medal of Honor citation reads:
For jumping overboard from the U.S. Training Ship Portsmouth, at the Washington Navy Yard, 23 January 1882, and endeavoring to rescue Thomas Duncan, carpenter and calker, who had fallen overboard.

See also

List of Medal of Honor recipients during peacetime

References

External links

1858 births
Year of death missing
Military personnel from New York City
United States Navy sailors
United States Navy Medal of Honor recipients
Non-combat recipients of the Medal of Honor